Pratt House may refer to:

in Canada
Pratt House, West Vancouver, British Columbia, designed by Charles Edward Pratt

in the United States
(by state then city)
Charles H. Pratt House, Phoenix, Arizona, listed on the National Register of Historic Places (NRHP) in Mariposa County
Charles M. Pratt House, Ojai, California, listed on the NRHP in Ventura County
Dr. Ambrose Pratt House, Chester, Connecticut, listed on the NRHP in Middlesex County
Pratt House (Essex, Connecticut), listed on the NRHP in Middlesex County
James Pratt Funeral Service, Hartford, Connecticut, listed on the NRHP in Hartford County
Clark-Pratt House, Kenton, Delaware, listed on the NRHP in Kent County
Pratt House, Milford, Delaware, National Register of Historic Places listings in Sussex County, Delaware
A.W. Pratt House, Iowa City, Iowa, listed on the NRHP in Johnson County
Cottonwood Ranch, Studley, Kansas, listed on the NRHP as the John Fenton Pratt Ranch in Sheridan County
Dexter Pratt House, Cambridge, Massachusetts, |listed on the NRHP in Middlesex County
Pratt Historic Building, Cohasset, Massachusetts, listed on the NRHP in Norfolk County
Miles Pratt House, Watertown, Massachusetts, listed on the NRHP in Middlesex County
Capt. Josiah Pratt House, Foxboro, Massachusetts, listed on the NRHP in Norfolk County
Pratt-Faxon House, Quincy, Massachusetts, listed on the NRHP in Norfolk County
Pratt House (Reading, Massachusetts), listed on the NRHP in Middlesex County
Stillman Pratt House, Reading, Massachusetts, listed on the NRHP in Middlesex County
Lanphere-Pratt House, Coldwater, Michigan, listed on the NRHP in Branch County
Pratt-Tabor House, Red Wing, Minnesota, listed on the NRHP in Goodhue County
Spratt-Allen-Aull House, Lexington, Missouri, listed on the NRHP in Lafayette County
Erwin Library and Pratt House, Boonville, New York, listed on the NRHP in Oneida County
Caroline Ladd Pratt House, Brooklyn, New York
Pratt House (Elmira, New York), listed on the NRHP in Chemung County
John Wells Pratt House, Fulton, New York, listed on the NRHP in Oswego County
Zadock Pratt House, Prattsville, New York, listed on the NRHP in Greene County
Cabe-Pratt-Harris House, Hillsborough, North Carolina, listed on the NRHP in Orange County
Wallace E. Pratt House, Salt Flat, Texas, listed on the NRHP in Culberson County
Wallace Pratt Lodge, Gaudalupe Mountain National Park, Texas, listed on the NRHP in Culberson County
Orson Pratt House, St. George, Utah, listed on the NRHP in Washington County
Pratt-McDaniels-LaFlamme House, Bennington, Vermont, listed on the NRHP in Bennington County
John A. Pratt House, Menomonee Falls, Wisconsin, listed on the NRHP in Waukesha County
Hannah Pratt House, Waukesha, Wisconsin, listed on the NRHP in Waukesha County